The Grammy Award for Best Spoken Word Poetry Album is a category in the annual Grammy Awards, that was first presented at the 2023 show on February 5, 2023.

According to the Recording Academy, this new category "recognizes excellence in spoken word albums specific to the performance of poetry with or without music."

Up to and including the 64th Grammy Awards, all spoken word recordings fell under one category, the Best Spoken Word Album. As of 2023, the Spoken Word category has been renamed Best Audio Book, Narration & Storytelling Recording. This category recognizes excellence in spoken word albums, but no longer includes spoken word poetry.

Winners and nominees

References 

Grammy Award categories
Awards established in 2023
2023 establishments in the United States